The 2015 edition of the Men's Handball Tournament of the African Games was the 11th, organized by the African Handball Confederation and played under the auspices of the International Handball Federation, the handball sport governing body. The tournament was held from 10 to 19 September 2015 at the Palais des Sports Kintélé in Brazzaville, Republic of Congo, contested by 10 national teams and won by Egypt.

Squads

Format
The 10 teams were divided into four groups (Groups A+B+C+D) for the preliminary round.
Round robin for the preliminary round; the top two teams of each group advanced to the quarterfinals.
From there on a knockout system was used until the final.

Draw

Group stage 
Times given below are in UTC+1.

Group A

Group B

Group C

Group D

Knockout stage
All matches were played in: Palais des sports Kintélé, Brazzaville

Quarter-finals

Semi-finals

Bronze medal match

Gold medal match

Final standings

References

External links
 Tournament profile at todor66.com

Handball at the 2015 African Games
Handball in the Republic of the Congo